Margaret Brady may refer to:

Margaret Brady (politician) (1857–1932), Irish politician
Margaret Anne Brady, fictional character